FitzHardinge is a surname. Notable people with the surname include:

Baron FitzHardinge, created in the Peerage of the United Kingdom on 5 August 1861
Earl FitzHardinge, created in the Peerage of the United Kingdom in 1841
Edward Fitzhardinge Campbell (1880–1957), Irish rugby international
Francis Berkeley, 2nd Baron FitzHardinge FSA (1826–1896), British Liberal politician
Henry Berkeley Fitzhardinge Maxse KCMG (1832–1883), Newfoundland colonial leader and a captain during the Crimean War
John Fitzhardinge Paul Butler VC DSO (1888–1916), British Army officer during World War I, recipient of the Victoria Cross
Maurice Berkeley, 1st Baron FitzHardinge, GCB PC, DL (1788–1867), former Royal Navy First Sea Lord
Viscount Fitzhardinge, extinct title in the Peerage of Ireland